Mordellistena semiferruginea is a species of beetle in the genus Mordellistena of the family Mordellidae. It was described by Reitter in 1911.

References

Beetles described in 1911
semiferruginea